Villa Rosario is a corregimiento in Capira District, Panamá Oeste Province, Panama with a population of 4,496 as of 2010. Its population as of 1990 was 2,363; its population as of 2000 was 3,214.

References

Corregimientos of Panamá Oeste Province